VH1 Behind the Music: Go-Go's Collection is the Go-Go's third compilation album, released in 2000, on the Interscope Records label. It contains previously released songs from the band, including all of their singles, except "He's So Strange", originally on their second album, the 1982 Vacation, plus a number of stand-out tracks, and one non-album B-side, "Speeding", also recorded during the Vacation sessions.

The compilation album was released a year before the group definitively reunited for their comeback studio album God Bless the Go-Go's, which was released in 2001.

Track listing
"We Got the Beat"
"Our Lips Are Sealed"
"Lust to Love"
"Skidmarks on My Heart"
"This Town"
"Can't Stop the World"
"Fading Fast"
"Vacation"
"Beatnik Beach"
"Get Up and Go"
"Speeding" (B side from Vacation sessions)
"Girl of 100 Lists"
"Head over Heels"
"Turn to You"
"Yes or No"
"I'm the Only One"
"Mercenary"

Tracks 1 to 7 are from Beauty and the Beat, 1981
Tracks 8 to 10 and 12 are from Vacation, 1982
Tracks 13 to 17 from Talk Show, 1984

References

2000 compilation albums
The Go-Go's albums